Claremore   is a city and the county seat of Rogers County in Green Country or northeastern Oklahoma, United States. The population was 19,580 at the 2020 census, a 5.4 percent increase over the figure of 18,581 recorded in 2010.  Located in the foothills of the Ozark Mountains, the town is part of the Tulsa Metropolitan Area and home to Rogers State University. It is best known as the home of early 20th-century entertainer Will Rogers.

This area was part of the territory of the Osage, but they were forced out under a treaty with the United States. During the Indian Removal period and until statehood, this area was a reserve of the Cherokee Nation, which had been removed from its territory in the Southeast United States. This was within what was known as the Cherokee Cooweescoowee District.

History 

Around 1802, bands of Osage Indians settled in this area of what is now northeastern Oklahoma. Black Dog was the chief of a band that settled at Pasona, where Claremore later developed. He shared power with chiefs Clermont (aka Claremore), and Pawhuska. Clermont, named by French traders, settled with his band in a village known as Pasuga, meaning "Big Cedar", which was located on an ancient platform earthwork mound in this area.

The Osage village of Pasuga was destroyed by Cherokee in June 1817, during the Battle of Claremore Mound, also known as the Battle of the Strawberry Moon. These Western Cherokee had moved into the region from the southeastern United States and were perpetually competing with the Osage, who looked down on them. At the time of the attack, most of the men were out of the villages to hunt bison on the plains. The Cherokee killed the men in the village, and took more than 100 women and children captive, selling them to eastern Cherokee. Accounts differ as to whether chief Clermont was killed in the raid.

After the Indian Removal Act of 1830 was passed by Congress, this area was designated as part of Indian Territory and the Cherokee Nation were assigned much of this territory. Claremore and the mound were within a part of the Cooweescoowee District in the northwestern part of the Cherokee Nation.

The Rogers family, for whom the county is named, were among the first European-American settlers. Clem Rogers, father of the famous entertainer Will Rogers, moved to the county in 1856. The Clem Rogers home (Will Rogers' birthplace), still stands outside Oologah, and is considered an important historical site. Clem Rogers was a major advocate of Oklahoma statehood; he was the oldest delegate to the state's Constitutional Convention in 1907 at age 69. He and other members of his family were buried at the Will Rogers Memorial.

A post office was established on June 25, 1874. The coming of railways to Indian Territory was the driving factor in early growth. Two early lines intersected in the center of town. The town changed the spelling of its name from Clermont to Claremore on September 19, 1882. A clerk recording the town as having a post office had spelled the name incorrectly, and it stuck. The town was incorporated in the Cherokee Nation on May 2, 1903.  newspaper, the Claremore Daily Progress, was founded in 1893 by cowboy Joe Klein and is still published daily. It is the oldest business in Rogers County.

Growth was aided by the popularity of sulphur springs among Americans in the late 19th and early 20th centuries. They believed bathing in such springs to have medical benefits.  George Eaton had settled with his family in the Claremore area in 1874 and conducted farming and cattle raising. He later branched into the mercantile business, real estate, and oil exploration. While drilling just east of Claremore in 1903, Easton struck an underground pool of water that smelled of sulfur. Local physician Dr. W. G. Williams tested the water and marketed it as a cure. Known as "Radium Water", it contained no radium, but hydrogen sulfide and sulfur compounds that were believed to make it medically useful. Eaton built a bath house and promoted the pool area as Radium Town. Radium Town was centered on 9th Street between Seminole and Dorothy. Bath houses were built by promoters all over this area of Claremore, and for a time attracted travelers and tourists for the waters. Only one was still standing as of 2008. first hospital was established in the early 1900s along what is now known as Will Rogers Boulevard, or Oklahoma State Highway 20. The building is standing and is currently being renovated.

The town has many historic homes and other buildings, with several located in the old business district. In 2002, Claremore received a grant from the state's Oklahoma Main Street program to redevelop its business district with improved urban design and enhancement of historic properties. Renovation work on the downtown was completed in 2007. On July 9, 2020, the Supreme Court of the United States determined in McGirt v. Oklahoma that the reservations of the Five Tribes, comprising much of Eastern Oklahoma, were never disestablished by Congress and thus are still "Indian Country" for the purposes of criminal law.

In popular culture
The Rodgers and Hammerstein musical Oklahoma! is set in Claremore and the surrounding area, in 1906 (the year before Oklahoma became a state).  The Quantum Leap season 3 episode "8½ Months" is also set near Claremore. The movie Where the Heart Is fictionally portrays Rogers County and the area surrounding Claremore.

Claremore was featured in the Supernatural season 14 episode "Nightmare Logic," where Maggie tracks a ghoul to the town.

Geography
Claremore is located at  (36.315181, -95.612784).

The city is located in Green Country, a popular nickname for northeast Oklahoma that stems from the region's green vegetation and relatively high number of hills and lakes compared to central and western areas of Oklahoma. Claremore lies near the Verdigris River with undulating terrain producing hills and valleys. The town primary water sources are the Claremore and Oologah lakes, both within the drainage basin of the Verdigris River.

Climate
Claremore experiences a humid subtropical climate with cold winters and hot summers.

Transportation

Claremore is a major intersection of heavily traveled highways. Interstate 44 crosses the town to its southeast. State Highway 66 (historic US-66) was designated along with one of the main east–west roads of the town. State Highway 88 and State Highway 20 intersect within the town.

Two railroad lines, the Kansas and Arkansas Valley Railway line (now owned by Union Pacific) and the St. Louis-San Francisco Railway or "Frisco" line (now owned by BNSF) intersect in Claremore. The traffic problems resulting from the intersection of two major national rail lines have led to discussions among town officials about how best to improve traffic flow.

Claremore Regional Airport (KGCM; FAA ID GCM), is located about 7 miles east of Claremore, and features a paved 5200 x 75 ft. runway.

Commercial air transportation is available out of Tulsa International Airport, about 22 miles southwest.

Demographics

As of the census of 2000, there were 15,873 people, 6,283 households, and 4,165 families residing in the town. The population density was 1,319.4 people per square mile (509.4/km2). There were 6,784 housing units at an average density of 563.9 per square mile (217.7/km2). The racial makeup of the town was 75.69% White, 1.99% African American, 14.31% Native American, 0.44% Asian, 0.03% Pacific Islander, 1.12% from other races, and 6.42% from two or more races. Hispanic or Latino of any race were 3.02% of the population.

There were 6,283 households, out of which 33.6% had children under the age of 18 living with them, 49.6% were married couples living together, 12.4% had a female householder with no husband present, and 33.7% were non-families. 29.7% of all households were made up of individuals, and 13.8% had someone living alone who was 65 years of age or older. The average household size was 2.43 and the average family size was 3.02.

In the town, the population was spread out, with 26.7% under the age of 18, 9.0% from 18 to 24, 27.6% from 25 to 44, 19.8% from 45 to 64, and 16.9% who were 65 years of age or older. The median age was 36 years. For every 100 females, there were 89.5 males. For every 100 females age 18 and over, there were 86.1 males.

The median income for a household in the town was $34,547, and the median income for a family was $45,810. Males had a median income of $36,227 versus $21,742 for females.  The per capita income for the town was $17,853.  About 8.9% of families and 11.9% of the population were below the poverty line, including 15.4% of those under the age of 18 and 15.0% of those 65 and older.

Education 

Claremore is home to the main campus of Rogers State University, which grants a master's degree and bachelor's and associate's degrees. The university serves more than 4,300 students. It is the only public four-year university in the Tulsa Metropolitan Area.

Claremore is also home to one of four campuses of Northeast Tech, a vocational training school.  The Claremore campus serves over 200 students and offers both full-time and short-term classes.

Public school district serving Claremore is the Claremore Independent School District, consisting of Claremore High School, Will Rogers Junior High, Catalayah Elementary, Westside Elementary, Claremont Elementary, Stuart Roosa Elementary, and the Alternative Learning Center.

The first school in the Claremore area was opened to students in 1870.  The first major high school was built in 1919; it was the most expensive public school building in the state of Oklahoma at the time. The building was used as a school for almost 80 years, until 1999. The increasing costs of maintenance of the old building forced its closure.

Economy 
Claremore's economy is diversified. Baker Hughes, an oil field services company, has a large presence in the town. Together with several other large companies, it is located in Claremore Industrial Park. This is only a few miles from the Tulsa Port of Catoosa, located on the Verdigris and Arkansas rivers. Coal mining is also an important industry; strip-style mines are operating on both the north and south sides of town.

Media 
Claremore has a website called moreClaremore.com, which focuses on positive community journalism. It was launched in April 2013 and centers on community events, local businesses, people, and schools. It also features the central community calendar for the area. The site has an average of 40,000 visitors per month and has an active social media presence, with more than 29,000 followers on Facebook. 

The daily newspaper (and one of the oldest ongoing businesses in the county) is the Claremore Daily Progress, first published as a weekly in 1892 and as a daily in 1893. As of September 2020, the Claremore Daily Progress only publishes two print editions a week.

National Register of Historic Places

As of February 2022, the National Register of Historic Places list the following Claremore sites, buildings, structures or districts as worthy of preservation for their historical significance:

(note that mauve colour for #3 denotes "district" rather than a specific item)

|}

Other attractions 

 J. M. Davis Arms and Historical Museum
 Will Rogers Memorial Museum
 Will Rogers Downs
 Oklahoma Military Academy Museum

Notable people 
 Levy Adcock, football player
 Brad Carson, former U.S. Congressman
 Rotnei Clarke, basketball player
 Mercedes Lackey, author
 Patti Page, singer and entertainer
 Carl Radle, bassist
 Dave Rader, baseball player
 Lynn Riggs, playwright
 Will Rogers, entertainer, comedian, and actor
 Stuart Roosa, astronaut
 Kywin Supernaw, NFL player
 Kimberly Teehee, delegate-designate of the Cherokee Nation to the U.S. House of Representatives
 Helen Walton, philanthropist and wife of Walmart founder Sam Walton
 Madison Whitekiller, 2017-18 Miss Cherokee

Town twinning 
  Muravlenko

Notes

References

External links

 City of Claremore
 Claremore Chamber of Commerce
 Claremore Convention & Visitors Bureau
 Claremore Museum of History
 Claremore information, photos and videos on TravelOK.com Official travel and tourism website for the State of Oklahoma
 Claremore, Oklahoma gallery at Wikimedia
 Encyclopedia of Oklahoma History and Culture - Claremore (City)

Cities in Rogers County, Oklahoma
Cities in Oklahoma
County seats in Oklahoma
Tulsa metropolitan area
Cherokee towns in Oklahoma